Élisée Dionne (August 21, 1828 – August 22, 1892) was a Canadian provincial politician.

Born in Kamouraska, Lower Canada, Dionne was a member of the Legislative Council of Quebec for Grandville from 1867 to 1892.

References

1828 births
1892 deaths
Conservative Party of Quebec MLCs
People from Bas-Saint-Laurent